was a Japanese actress and voice actress from Iwate Prefecture. She was represented with Gekidan For You.

Filmography

TV dramas

Films

Dubbing

References

External links
 (Gekidan For You homepage) 
Nihon Tarento Meikan Chineko Sugawara's profile 

Japanese voice actresses
Voice actresses from Iwate Prefecture
1938 births
2016 deaths